The GAZelle is a series of light commercial vehicles: pickup trucks, vans and minibuses made by Russian car manufacturer GAZ. At the time of the dissolution of the Soviet Union and transition to a market economy, the Russian automobile industry had not produced a much-demanded LCV similar to the Ford Transit or VW T4 class. The GAZelle shares many parts with the company's passenger cars (especially GAZ-31029), in fact, models produced until 1998 had the same grille. Riga Autobus Factory, which formerly manufactured minibuses for the whole USSR, remained in Latvia, now required its vehicles be sold to the now-foreign Russian market for hard currency. Responding to this market opportunity, GAZ swiftly developed its own LCV called GAZelle (the name is a pun on "gazelle"), that taken together with its lighter version Sobol now account for the majority of the Russian van and light truck market and has strong positions in the markets of other CIS countries, ranking as GAZ's most popular and successful products.

The GAZelle is a copy of a 1986 Ford Transit, and has been very successful on the Russian market despite minimal upgrades.

Various sources do not refer to the vehicle as a plain copy of the Ford Transit. The development dates back to both Soviet designs of the 1980s, which were originally intended for production in a never commissioned vehicle plant in Kirovabad (Azerbaijan), as well as unofficial developments of the GAZ plant from the same period. The project could only be pursued further by GAZ after the collapse of the Soviet Union. In August 1993 the GAZelle was presented at a motor show in Moscow, production started in July or at the end of 1994 in Nizhny Novgorod. Despite the similar appearance, the first generation of the GAZelle differs from the 1986 Ford Transit in various technical features and details, such as engines, transmissions, interior design, steering and brake components. The GAZelle uses only Russian-made engines, different manual transmissions were installed, there was no option for an automatic transmission. Also, the front seats have been changed in design, as well as the heating and ventilation system and the engine radiator, the dashboard was redesigned. The ground clearance of the Russian vehicles is higher, it was adapted to the road conditions in Russia. 

In 1999 GAZ started production of all-terrain 4x4 versions of GAZelle that utilized parts of the heavier-class vehicles. Now it features an optional rear differential lock offered at ~US$500 extra.

By 2005 one million GAZelles had been built. Apart from the CIS countries and Central and Eastern Europe, GAZelles are exported to Asian and African markets, including Morocco and the Philippines.

In 2010–2011 the GAZelle family underwent a serious upgrade. The upgraded model was renamed GAZelle Business. The changes affected 20 main vehicle units and systems, including steering, brakes, gearbox, cooling system, transmission and interior.

In 2013 GAZ started serial production of the new generation GAZelle NEXT light commercial vehicle that features freighter, van, minibus and other versions of different sizes.

Generations

Models
 GAZ-3302 dropside truck and chassis, rear-wheel drive, regular three-seat cab
 GAZ-33021 dropside truck and chassis, improved, RWD
 GAZ-33023 dropside truck and chassis, all-wheel drive
 GAZ-33027 dropside truck and chassis, six-seat "King Cab" extended cab, RWD
 GAZ-330237 dropside truck and chassis, extended cab, AWD
 GAZ-3221 minibus, 8 seats, RWD
 GAZ-32213 minibus, 13 seats, RWD
 GAZ-322132 minibus, 13 seats (marshrutka, for shuttle services), RWD
 GAZ-2705 panel van, RWD
 GAZ-27051 ambulance, RWD
 GAZ-27052 Combi panel van, extended cab, RWD
 GAZ-27057 Combi panel van, extended cab, AWD

Variants
The GAZ Sobol is a lighter duty version of the GAZelle, built on a shorter wheelbase. It was introduced in 1998.

The GAZ Valdai is a heavier duty version of the GAZelle, built on a longer wheelbase. It was introduced in 2003 and discontinued in favor of the GAZon.

The GAZelle cabin is also used for building tracked all-terrain carriers such as GAZ-3409 «Bobr» (Beaver).

Before GAZ introduced its own GAZelle-based minibus, various smaller Russian factories launched rebuilding of freight GAZelles into minibuses ("Pskova-2214", "STG-01") and different custom vehicles. A few Russian and Ukrainian factories still produce custom buses and ambulances based on GAZelles of "Business" and "NEXT" generations.

Trim levels
Before the 2010 upgrade, customers were not given the opportunity to select options. Currently the Gazelle-Business can be ordered with a rear differential lock, ABS braking system, "de luxe" instrument panel, and the "Package" option that includes fog lights, electroproof mirrors, front electric windows, dashboard "de luxe" (radio control buttons on the steering wheel and audio package) and central locking of the front doors.

Gazelle NEXT generation of LCVs has its own schedule of basic trim levels and options.

Gallery

See also
 FIAT Ducato
 VW Crafter
 Mercedes-Benz Sprinter
 LDV Maxus

References

External links
GaZ's official GAZelle Page  (English)
Official site of plant in Turkey
Club car owners Gazelle (Russian)

Police vehicles
Vans
Pickup trucks
Minibuses
GAZ Group vehicles
Cars of Russia
1990s cars
2000s cars
2010s cars